The Thermals were an American indie rock band based in Portland, Oregon, United States. The group was formed in 2002. With influences heavily rooted in both lofi, as well as standard rock, the band's songs were also known for their political and religious imagery.

History
In 2002 former bandmates Hutch Harris and Kathy Foster came together to form the Thermals, having previously worked together, most notably in the folk duo Hutch & Kathy. Their first album, More Parts per Million, was released in 2003 by Sub Pop Records. The album was recorded and performed entirely by Hutch Harris, who played every instrument. The first live lineup was Harris with Kathy Foster on bass, Jordan Hudson (also of M. Ward and The operacycle) on drums and Ben Barnett on guitar. Their follow-up album, 2004's Fuckin A, was mixed by Death Cab For Cutie member Chris Walla. During that period Ben Barnett left the band and Hutch Harris took over the role as guitarist.

Their third album The Body, The Blood, The Machine was produced by Brendan Canty of Fugazi and won the group much recognition and acclaim, appearing on multiple top album lists for 2006 such as NPR, The AV Club and Pitchfork. The song "A Pillar of Salt" was also featured on EA's Skate 3 in-game radio. Jordan Hudson dropped out of the band during the recording of their third album. Kathy Foster took over percussion duties in the recording studio, which Lorin Coleman performed on tour.

The Thermals' fourth album Now We Can See, was released in 2009 on the label Kill Rock Stars and produced by John Congleton.  Again, Foster worked as the percussionist on the album. Westin Glass joined the group as a drummer after the album had been completed.

The Thermals fifth album, Personal Life was released September 7, 2010.

The Thermals' cover of the song "Little Boxes" was used as the opening song for Weeds season 8 episode 8, "Five Miles From Yetzer Hara" which aired on August 19, 2012; their song "Here's Your Future" from The Body, The Blood, The Machine having been previously used in the second episode of the third season ("A Pool and his Money" August 20, 2007).

In October 2012, former guitarist Joel Burrows died from complications from a car accident.

On January 31, 2013, The Thermals signed to Saddle Creek Records and planned to release their new album Desperate Ground on April 16, 2013. In March 2013, The Thermals were named one of Fuse TV's 30 must-see artists at SXSW.

On January 6, 2016, The Thermals announced the release of their seventh studio album titled We Disappear. It was released on March 25, 2016 via Saddle Creek records.

On April 9, 2018, the band announced that they were officially disbanding after 16 years.

Band members

Final lineup
Hutch Harris – vocals, guitar, keyboard (2002–2018)
Kathy Foster – bass, vocals (2002–2018)
Westin Glass – drums, vocals (2008–2018)

Former members
Jordan Hudson – drums (2002–2005)
Ben Barnett – guitar (2002–2003)
Caitlin Love – drums (2006)
Lorin Coleman – drums (2007–2008)
Joel Burrows – guitar (2007)

Timeline

Discography

Studio albums

Singles and EPs

Live albums

Compilations

References

External links

 
 The Thermals at Sub Pop Records
 The Thermals on FreeIndie

Indie rock musical groups from Oregon
Punk rock groups from Oregon
Musical groups established in 2002
Musical groups from Portland, Oregon
Sub Pop artists
Lo-fi music groups
American musical trios
2002 establishments in Oregon
Musical groups disestablished in 2018
Rock music groups from Oregon
Saddle Creek Records artists